Eretmocera thephagones is a moth of the family Scythrididae. It was described by Klunder van Gijen in 1912. It is found on Java, an island in Indonesia.

The fore- and hindwings are black and yellow.

References

thephagones
Moths described in 1912